The Junior men's race at the 2007 IAAF World Cross Country Championships was held at the Mombasa Golf Course in Mombasa, Kenya, on March 24, 2007.  Reports of the event were given in the Herald, and for the IAAF.

Complete results for individuals, and for teams were published.

Race results

Junior men's race (8 km)

Individual

Teams

Note: Athletes in parentheses did not score for the team result.

Participation
According to an unofficial count, 126 athletes from 34 countries participated in the Junior men's race. This is in agreement with the official numbers as published.

 (6)
 (4)
 (5)
 (5)
 (3)
 (1)
 (5)
 (6)
 (2)
 (5)
 (6)
 (6)
 (6)
 (1)
 (1)
 (6)
 (2)
 (1)
 (2)
 (1)
 (1)
 (2)
 (4)
 (6)
 (5)
 (1)
 (6)
 (6)
 (1)
 (6)
 (5)
 (1)
 (4)
 (4)

See also
 2007 IAAF World Cross Country Championships – Senior men's race
 2007 IAAF World Cross Country Championships – Senior women's race
 2007 IAAF World Cross Country Championships – Junior women's race

References

Junior men's race at the World Athletics Cross Country Championships
IAAF World Cross Country Championships
2007 in youth sport